Household pennant is a quite common Finnish tradition. A household pennant can be flown whenever there is no flag flying day and it is usually a means of telling that the "master of the house" is at home. These pennants have a long, narrow, triangular shape, usually half the length of the flag pole. The triangle has a base of roughly one tenth of the length and it is connected to the pole via a single lanyard, giving the pennant the ability to rotate while flying.

The different regions of Finland have been connected with some traditional colors (often from the coats of arms of the historical provinces of Finland and modern provinces), and these are often reflected in the household pennant. The pennants sometimes also incorporate the regional arm into the design. The shapes, designs and uses of the pennants are however not regulated by law, as long as they do not interfere with uses of the regular flag, which is regulated. It is also allowed to fly a pennant overnight. In addition to the general pennant (which is based on the flag of Finland) and the regional variants, there are also family, city and municipality variants, of which any may be flown. A common practice is to either fly the pennant of the region of residence or the pennant from which the family members come.

Finnish regional household pennants 
The different regions of Finland have been connected with some traditional colors (often from the coats of arms of the historical provinces of Finland and modern provinces), and these are often reflected in the household pennant. The pennants sometimes also incorporate the regional arm into the design. A common practice is to either fly the pennant of the region of residence or the pennant from which the family members come. As the household pennant is connected to the pole with a single lanyard, the pennant has the ability to revolve around its horizontal axis. Thus, an actual pennant does not have a "top" side, making some of the pennants identical in practice.

The colors of the coat of arms

See also 
 Flag of Finland

References

External links 
 Isännänviirit Flagmore 

Vexillology